The Northern City Line is a commuter railway line in England, which runs from Moorgate station to Finsbury Park in London with services running beyond. It is part of the Great Northern Route services, and operates as the south-eastern branch of the East Coast Main Line (ECML). It is underground from Moorgate to Drayton Park in Highbury, from which point it runs in a cutting until joining the ECML south of Finsbury Park. Its stations span northern inner districts of Greater London southwards to the City of London, the UK's main financial centre. Since December 2015, its service timetable has been extended to run into the late evenings and at weekends, meeting a new franchise commitment for a minimum of six trains per hour until 23:59 on weekdays and four trains per hour at weekends.

Until March 2009, it also served  surface-level station on the London Midland Region. The Northern City Line's name is derived from the fact that it was originally a London Underground line, where it was described or managed as part of both the Metropolitan and Northern lines (sometimes as the "Highbury Branch"), although never connected to either. Built as an isolated route with a northern terminus at Finsbury Park, reconstruction connected it to the British Rail network in 1976 and began its modern service pattern. One of London's deep-level railways, the Northern City is unlike the others in being owned by Network Rail and served by commuter trains operated by Great Northern from Moorgate to Finsbury Park and onwards to Hertfordshire.

In 2016, it was proposed that all London rail services be transferred to Transport for London to create a London Suburban Metro, which would bring the line back under the jurisdiction of TfL.

History 
The Great Northern & City Railway (GN&CR) was planned to allow electrified trains to run from the Great Northern Railway (GNR, now the East Coast Main Line) at Finsbury Park to the City of London at Moorgate. For this reason the line was popularly known as the "Big Tube" in its early days. However, the GNR eventually opposed the scheme and cancelled its electrification plans, and the line opened in 1904 with the northern terminus in tunnels underneath Finsbury Park GNR station. It was originally electrified using an unusual fourth-rail system with a conductor rail outside both running rails.

The GN&CR was bought in 1913 by the Metropolitan Railway (MR), which operated what are today the Metropolitan and Hammersmith & City lines and the former East London line. The MR had plans to link it to the Circle and Waterloo & City lines, but these were never fulfilled. During this period, the line remained an isolated branch, without through services to any other part of the rail network. Carriages were brought to it through a connection into a freight yard near Drayton Park station, where a small depot was built to service trains.

The GN&CR generating station closed when the MR took over, and became the studio of Gainsborough Pictures. After lying derelict for many years, it became a temporary venue for the Almeida Theatre. It has since been redeveloped as apartments.

After the formation of the London Passenger Transport Board in 1933, the MR was amalgamated with the other Underground railways and the line was renamed the Northern City Line. In 1934 it was re-branded as part of the Edgware–Morden line (which was renamed the Northern line in 1937), and in 1939 operations were transferred from the Metropolitan to the Northern. As part of London Transport's New Works Programme, the Northern Heights plan was to connect the Northern City Line at Finsbury Park to existing main-line suburban branches running to Alexandra Palace, High Barnet and Edgware, which would be taken over by London Transport and electrified. The Highgate branch of the Edgware–Morden line would connect to this network north of Highgate. Only parts of this plan were completed: when the Second World War started, the Highgate link and electrification of the Barnet branch were well under way and ultimately completed, but the Northern City connection to Highgate was first postponed and finally cancelled after the war.

After the war there were proposals to extend the Northern City Line north and south. The London Plan Working Party Report of 1949 proposed several new lines and suburban electrification schemes for London, lettered from A to M. The lower-priority routes J and K would have seen the Northern City Line extended to Woolwich (Route J) and Crystal Palace (Route K), retaining the "Northern Heights" extensions to Edgware and Alexandra Palace. The lines would have run in small-diameter tube tunnels south from Moorgate to Bank and London Bridge. The "K" branch would have run under Peckham to Peckham Rye, joining the old Crystal Palace (High Level) branch (which was still open in 1949) near Lordship Lane. Nothing came of these proposals, and the Edgware, Alexandra Palace and Crystal Palace (High Level) branches were all closed to passengers in 1954. As a result, the Northern City Line remained isolated from the rest of the network.

In 1964, the Northern City Line (low level) platforms at Finsbury Park were given over to become the southbound platforms of both the Piccadilly line and (then new) Victoria Line, the former Piccadilly line platforms becoming the northbound Piccadilly and Victoria lines' platforms. From this time the NCL used Drayton Park as its terminus. At the same time a change was made at Highbury & Islington, with the northbound Northern City line diverted to a new platform alongside the northbound Victoria line, and the southbound Victoria using the former northbound Northern City platform, both providing cross-platform interchange. Passengers from Moorgate to Finsbury Park took the Northern City line to Highbury & Islington and then changed onto the Victoria Line.

In 1970 the line was connected (as intended by its original promoters) to the mainline via the high level platforms at Finsbury Park as part of a wider plan to electrify ECML suburban services. The line was renamed Northern line (Highbury Branch) and the following year an agreement was made to transfer it to British Rail. Commuter trains were run to/from Moorgate instead of King's Cross, relieving congestion at King's Cross.

The last London Underground services ran in October 1975 and British Rail services commenced in August 1976, replacing services to Broad Street via the city branch of the North London Line. These British Rail services used the name "Great Northern Electrics". The track and tunnels are now owned by Network Rail. The name "Northern City Line" has been revived to refer to the underground part of the route.

Infrastructure
From Finsbury Park to Drayton Park traction current is supplied at 25 kV AC via overhead line, controlled by York Electrical Control Room.

From Drayton Park to Moorgate traction current is supplied at 750 V DC via third rail. There are two electrical sections, separated by a gap at Poole Street:
 Queensland Road to Poole Street
 Poole Street to Finsbury Circus

Trains change from AC to DC traction supply, or vice versa, whilst standing at Drayton Park station. The platform starting signal on the Up platform at Drayton Park is held at danger (red) as the train approaches. This ensures that all trains stop to lower the pantograph before going into the tunnel.

In the 1970s the original London Underground fourth-rail traction current supply was converted to a third-rail 750V DC system. The redundant centre fourth-rail was disconnected and left in situ since it was difficult to remove in the narrow tunnels.

Signalling is controlled from Kings Cross power box. Between Drayton Park and Moorgate, there is no Automatic Warning System or Train Protection & Warning System equipment provided, due to the position of the auxiliary return rail. All signals are multiple aspect colour light signals fitted with train stop arms. Works to commission new digital signalling on the line took place during the Early May Bank Holiday in 2022

Operational procedures
Because mainline trains operate over the infrastructure inherited from London Underground, there are some practices on the NCL which differ from Railway Rulebook instructions, and these are contained in an additional publication. These include:

Passing signals at danger
If a train is standing at a signal at danger inside a tunnel and it is not possible for the driver to contact the signaller, the driver is permitted to pass that signal under their own authority. As soon as the train starts to move, the tripcock on the train will automatically operate and bring the train to a stop, so the driver must reset it before continuing. When they reach the next signal they must stop and attempt to contact the signaller, to inform the signaller of what has taken place regardless of the aspect that it is showing.

Platform starting signals, which let the train into a tunnel, can only be passed at danger with the signaller's authority.

Assisting a failed train
Unlike surface lines, the driver of a train which fails on the NCL is not required to leave the train to lay detonators and then wait for the assisting train. To ensure that the rear of the failed train is always visible, all trains working over the NCL are required to display three red lights at their rear: two tail lamps plus the red portion of the destination roller blind.

On reaching the failed train, the assisting driver will stop short then clip their tunnel telephone onto the tunnel wires so that they can discuss with the driver of the failed train how to carry out the assistance in order to get the trains moving again. Then the two trains are coupled together and the drivers can talk to each other over the usual cab-to-cab handsets before proceeding.

Rolling stock

As part of its contract to supply electrical equipment during the construction of the line, in 1901 British Thomson-Houston provided 35 sets of traction control equipment to Brush Electrical Engineering Company and Dick, Kerr & Company. The original plan was for 11 seven-car trains (33 motors and 44 trailers) and one shunting locomotive. Initially 26 motorcars and 32 trailer cars were built. They were known as the 'wooden' cars because they were fabricated of teak and mahogany on steel underframes. In 1906 Brush delivered another five motors and 13 trailers. There were of all-steel construction and naturally-enough referred to as 'steel cars'. The GN&CR converted one trailer to a motor car, bringing the fleet to 32 motors and 44 trailers. (The remaining sets of traction control equipment were used as maintenance spares.) Normal operation was six-car formations at peak times, reduced to two-car sets at other times. Seats were provided for 58 passengers in the wooden trailers and 64 in the steel ones. Motor cars seated 54 because of a  equipment compartment behind the driver's cab. Uniquely in England, coupling between cars was by means of link and pin on the centre-line.

The original fleet of 76 carriages was withdrawn and replaced by London Underground Standard Stock on 15 May 1939. These became the last pre-1938 trains running on the Underground, being phased out during the last weeks of October 1966 through 3 November. 1938 tube stock serviced the line, in variously three-, four- and six-car formations, until its temporary closure on 4 October 1975.

Services are currently operated by dual-voltage Class 717 electric multiple units (EMUs), which replaced Class 313 units as part of a franchise commitment when Govia Thameslink Railway took over management of the line and its services. The Class 717s began to enter service in March 2019. To comply with regulations for trains operating in single-bore tunnels where there is not enough clearance space for side evacuation, they have emergency doors at both ends of a unit. All stations are long enough to accept six-car trains.

Accidents and incidents

Moorgate tube crash
The Moorgate tube crash, the most serious peacetime accident on the London Underground, occurred at Moorgate on 28 February 1975, when a Highbury Branch train ran through the terminus at speed and crashed into the dead end of the tunnel beyond. The cause of the crash, which killed 43 people, was never determined. A report found that there was insufficient evidence to say if it was a deliberate act of the driver or due to a medical condition.

Tunnel penetration incident
A serious accident was averted by the actions of an observant train driver, and the line was restricted for several days for repairs. A subsequent investigation by the Rail Accident Investigation Branch was highly critical of carelessness on the construction companies involved and the planning approval process.

Passenger volume
This is the number of passengers using stations on the line from the year beginning April 2002 to the year beginning April 2019.

See also
 Northern Heights plan

References

Bibliography

External links 

 Underground Line Guide – Northern line – comprehensive history of the Northern line and its branches

Transport in the City of London
Transport in the London Borough of Islington
Railway lines in London
Railway lines opened in 1904
Standard gauge railways in London
Electric railways in the United Kingdom
Underground commuter rail